The seventy-eighth Minnesota Legislature first convened on January 5, 1993. The 67 members of the Minnesota Senate and the 134 members of the Minnesota House of Representatives were elected during the General Election of November 3, 1992.

Sessions 
The legislature met in a regular session from January 5, 1993, to May 17, 1993. A special session was convened on May 27, 1993, to consider the state budget, health and human services finance, higher education finance, financial disclosure of election campaign contributions, contingency airplane replacement funding, sentencing for repeat domestic abusers, and a revisor's bill to correct technical errors.

A continuation of the regular session was held between February 22, 1994, and May 6, 1994. An additional special session was convened on August 31, 1994, to strengthen legislation regarding sexual predators.

Party summary 
Resignations and new members are discussed in the "Membership changes" section, below.

Senate

House of Representatives

Leadership

Senate 
President of the Senate
Allan Spear (DFL-Minneapolis)

Senate Majority Leader
Roger Moe (DFL-Erskine)

Senate Minority Leader
Dean Johnson (R-Willmar)

House of Representatives 
Speaker of the House
Until September 15, 1993 Dee Long (DFL-Minneapolis)
After September 15, 1993 Irv Anderson (DFL-International Falls)

House Majority Leader
Until March 23, 1993 Alan Welle (DFL-Willmar)
From March 25, 1993, to September 15, 1993 Irv Anderson (DFL-International Falls)
After September 15, 1993 Phil Carruthers (DFL-Brooklyn Center)

House Minority Leader
Steve Sviggum (R-Kenyon)

Members

Senate

House of Representatives

Membership changes

Senate

House of Representatives

References 

 Minnesota Legislators Past & Present - Session Search Results (Session 78, Senate)
 Minnesota Legislators Past & Present - Session Search Results (Session 78, House)

78th
1990s in Minnesota
1993 in Minnesota
1994 in Minnesota
1993 U.S. legislative sessions
1994 U.S. legislative sessions